Born Free is a 1966 British drama film starring the real-life couple Virginia McKenna and Bill Travers as Joy and George Adamson, another real-life couple, who raised Elsa the Lioness, an orphaned lion cub, to adulthood and released her into the wilderness of Kenya. The film was produced by Open Road Films Ltd. and Columbia Pictures. The screenplay, written by blacklisted Hollywood writer Lester Cole (under the pseudonym "Gerald L.C. Copley"), was based upon Joy Adamson's 1960 non-fiction book Born Free. The film was directed by James Hill and produced by Sam Jaffe and Paul Radin.  Born Free, and its musical score, by John Barry, as well as the title song, with lyrics by Don Black and sung by Matt Monro, won numerous awards.

Plot summary
In the Northern Province of Kenya, a woman is killed and eaten by a male lion. British senior wildlife warden George Adamson (Bill Travers) is sent in to kill the menacing lion and also his female, who charges him in defence of her three cubs. Realizing they are now motherless, George brings the three cubs home to his wife Joy (Virginia McKenna) and raises them. They name the cubs Big One, Lastika, and Elsa, who is the youngest and the one which Joy and George become especially attached to. When the cubs get too old, the older two are sent to Rotterdam Zoo but the Adamsons choose to keep Elsa.

Some years later, Joy and George soon have to travel to Kiunga as George has been told by his boss, John Kendall (Geoffrey Keen) about a lion who is killing goats in a local village. George successfully manages to kill the lion and he and Joy are able to share a special holiday with Elsa, where they introduce her to the Indian Ocean. On returning to the Northern Province, the Adamsons learn that Elsa has caused a massive elephant stampede. Kendall states that the Adamsons can no longer keep Elsa and must find a zoo to take her in. However, Joy instead wishes to teach Elsa how to survive in the wild, which Kendall reluctantly gives her and George three months to do.

Joy and George travel to Meru National Park where they aim to release Elsa. Initially, they attempt to introduce Elsa to a male lion, which does not go to plan – they leave her overnight with a fresh zebra kill but return in the morning to find her all by herself. Elsa is constantly taken out to the bush but fails to make a kill, getting attacked by a warthog on one of these outings. Eventually, Joy and George decide to leave Elsa in the bush for at least a week and change the location of their camp so that Elsa can become more independent. However, they find her severely injured (possibly by wild lions). Joy still believes that she can teach Elsa to survive as she opposes sending her to a zoo, where she will have no freedom. This proves to be a good decision as Elsa eventually starts leaving the Adamsons for days at a time and eventually makes several kills. The Adamsons thus take her out for her final test – an attempt to join a wild pride. Elsa manages to fight a wild lioness and is accepted into the pride – Joy and George are overjoyed at their success but promise to see their dear friend again when they return to Kenya.

A year later, the Adamsons return to Kenya and are given a week to find Elsa. They are overjoyed to see that Elsa has succeeded as a wild lion and is now the mother of three cubs. However, Joy and George both agree that they will not interact with the cubs, allowing them to survive as wild lions.

Cast
 Virginia McKenna as Joy Adamson
 Bill Travers as George Adamson
 Geoffrey Keen as John Kendall
 Peter Lukoye as Nuru
 Surya Patel as the Doctor
 Geoffrey Best as Watson, a big game hunter
 Bill Godden as Sam

The film's credits list lions and lionesses Boy, Girl, Henrietta, Mara, Ugas, and "the Cubs".

Production
The film reunited the real-life couple Bill Travers and Virginia McKenna as a couple first seen together in The Smallest Show on Earth in 1957.

George Adamson served as chief technical advisor on the film and discusses his involvement in his first autobiography, Bwana Game (UK title, 1968), known in the US as A Lifetime with Lions. According to Ben Mankiewicz, who introduces the film on Turner Classic Movies, the production unit mainly used wild lions.

The making of the film was a life-changing experience for actors Virginia McKenna and her husband Bill Travers, who became animal rights activists and were instrumental in creating the Born Free Foundation.

One of the lions in the film was played by a former mascot of the Scots Guards, who had to leave him behind when they left Kenya.
The producers also acknowledged the help received from Emperor Haile Selassie of Ethiopia and the Game Department of Uganda.

Critical response and box-office
Born Free received critical acclaim. Review aggregator Rotten Tomatoes reports that 92% of 12 film critics have given the film a positive review, with a rating average of 7 out of 10.

Vincent Canby waxed enthusiastic about the film, writing in The New York Times, "Almost from the opening shot – a vast expanse of corn-coloured African plain where lions feed on the carcass of a freshly killed zebra – one knows that Joy Adamson's best-selling book Born Free has been entrusted to honest, intelligent filmmakers. Without minimising the facts of animal life or overly sentimentalising them, this film casts an enchantment that is just about irresistible."

The film was one of the most popular movies at the box office in Britain during 1966.

Accolades

The film is recognized by American Film Institute in these lists:
 2004: AFI's 100 Years...100 Songs:
 "Born Free" – Nominated
 2005: AFI's 100 Years of Film Scores – Nominated

Sequels and spinoffs
The book Born Free (1960) was followed by two other books, Living Free (1961) and Forever Free (1963). In 1972, a film sequel entitled Living Free was released. While deriving its name from the second book, the film was based on the third book in the series. It starred Susan Hampshire and Nigel Davenport as Joy and George Adamson although the film was not as well-received as its predecessor.

A documentary follow-up to Born Free, entitled The Lions Are Free, was released in 1969. The film follows Born Free-actor Bill Travers as he journeys to a remote area in Kenya to visit George Adamson, and several of Adamson's lion friends.

In 1974, a 13-episode American television series was broadcast by NBC, entitled Born Free, starring Diana Muldaur and Gary Collins as Joy and George Adamson. The series was later followed by television film in 1996 called Born Free: A New Adventure, with Linda Purl and Chris Noth. Joy and George Adamson do not appear as the main characters in the story. It spawned a TV series in 1998, but none of the episodes aired in the U.S.

To Walk with Lions (1999) depicts the last years of George Adamson's life, as seen through the eyes of his assistant, Tony Fitzjohn. George is portrayed by Richard Harris, and Honor Blackman makes a brief appearance as Joy.

The one-hour Nature documentary Elsa's Legacy: The Born Free Story was released on PBS stations in January 2011. It includes a collection of archival footage and an exploration into the lives of Joy and George Adamson during the years following release of the film.

See also
 Christian the lion

References

External links

Born Free website for the Born Free Foundation

 
 

1966 films
1960s adventure drama films
British children's adventure films
British adventure drama films
British films based on actual events
Children's drama films
Columbia Pictures films
Environmental films
Films scored by John Barry (composer)
Films adapted into television shows
Films directed by James Hill (British director)
Films set in Australia
Films set in Papua New Guinea
Films set in Kenya
Films set in the British Empire
Films about orphans
Films about lions
Films set in Africa
Films shot in Kenya
Films that won the Best Original Song Academy Award
Films that won the Best Original Score Academy Award
1960s children's adventure films
Films based on non-fiction books
1966 drama films
1960s English-language films
1960s British films